OneHope is a Napa Valley-based winery founded in 2007. The company is set up as a social enterprise to raise awareness and funding for charitable organizations and social causes. The company's charitable donations are made through the OneHope Foundation. The OneHope Foundation has raised over $6 million for various charities around the world and their Sparkling Brut has provided over 3 million meals to those in need. Some users initiate contact with One Hope Wine and do not receive a response, only repeat marketing emails.

OneHope co-founder Jake Kloberdanz is the company's chief executive officer.

OneHope co-founder Tiffany Wojtkiewicz is the company's president and recently named 2021 Wine Enthusiast 40 under 40 tastemaker in the beverage industry. She helped launch ONEHOPE's Cause Entrepreneur program for individuals to become sales representatives.

History

In 2005, Jake Kloberdanz was a district sales manager for E&J Gallo Winery. In August 2006, one of his childhood friends was diagnosed with Non-Hodgkins lymphoma. Kloberdanz had observed that products supporting charity sold well in grocery stores, and he began planning what would become OneHope. Kloberdanz and seven of his coworkers left Gallo to start OneHope as a charitable business in 2007. The company was launched with $10,000 and an initial partnership with Sonoma Wine Company and vintner David Eliot to create its wine. The company's first wine, a 2005 merlot, sold 8,000 bottles in its first year.

Mama D's Italian Kitchen, a local restaurant in Newport Beach, California, became OneHope Wine's first commercial account in 2007. Albertsons started carrying OneHope Wine in 2008. Young's Market Company became the company's first distributor in 2009.

Robert Mondavi Jr., owner and president of Folio Fine Wine Partners, became the company's winemaker in 2010. OneHope Wine's partnership with the Mondavi family began when OneHope vice president of sales and co-founder Sarah McPeake met Michael Mondavi, father of Robert Jr., at a wine tradeshow. Robert Mondavi Jr. also sources the ingredients used in OneHope Wine.

The company released its Darius Rucker signature series wine in 2012. Whole Foods Market began selling OneHope Wines in 2013.

In 2014, OneHope launched the Cause Entrepreneur program to market ONEHOPE Wine directly to the consumer via personal relationships and events that raise money for important causes to event hosts. Ten percent of event sales are donated to the host's cause of choice.

In 2017, Mari Wells Coyle joined as Head Winemaker and plays an integral part in developing wine education for the brand and its direct selling platform which empowers entrepreneurs to make an impact while making an income.

OneHope opened a winery in 2021 in Rutherford, California.

The winery and tasting room is designed by Howard Backen and open to OneHope's members of the 20/20 Collective. The 20/20 Collective (named in honor of the year the winery was built) is an annual membership based on three tiers, each offering members different wines, experiences, events and benefits.

References

External links

Food and drink companies established in 2007
Companies based in Napa County, California
California wine organizations
2007 establishments in California